The California Freeway and Expressway System is a system of existing or planned freeways and expressways in the U.S. state of California. It encompasses both State highways and federal highways in California. It was defined by Article 2 (commencing with section 250) of Chapter 2 of Division 1 of the Streets and Highways Code. in 1959.

List of roads in the system
The following is a list of roads defined by the Streets and Highways Code, sections 250–257, as part of the California Freeway and Expressway System. Some of the routes listed may still be in the planning stages of being fully upgraded to freeways or expressways.

State Route 1 (part)
State Route 2 (part)
State Route 3 (part)
State Route 4 (part)
Interstate 5
U.S. Route 6
State Route 7
Interstate 8
State Route 9
Interstate 10
State Route 11
State Route 12
State Route 13 (part)
State Route 14
Interstate 15 and State Route 15
State Route 16 (part)
State Route 17 (part)
State Route 18
State Route 19
State Route 20 (part)
State Route 22 (part)
State Route 23 (part)
State Route 24
State Route 25 (part)
State Route 26 (part)
State Route 27
State Route 28
State Route 29
State Route 32
State Route 33 (part)
State Route 34
State Route 35 (part)
State Route 36 (part)
State Route 37
State Route 38 (part)
State Route 39 (part)
Interstate 40
State Route 41 (part)
State Route 43 (part)
State Route 44
State Route 45 (part)
State Route 46 (part)
State Route 47
State Route 48
State Route 49 (part)
U.S. Route 50
State Route 51 (signed as Interstate 80 Business in Sacramento)
State Route 52
State Route 53
State Route 54
State Route 55
State Route 56
State Route 57
State Route 58 (part)
State Route 59
State Route 60
State Route 61
State Route 62 (part)
State Route 63
State Route 65
State Route 66
State Route 67
State Route 68
State Route 70
State Route 71
State Route 72
State Route 73
State Route 74
State Route 75
State Route 76 (part)
State Route 77 (part)
State Route 78
State Route 79 (part)
Interstate 80
State Route 81
State Route 82
State Route 83
State Route 84 (part)
State Route 85
State Route 86
State Route 87
State Route 88
State Route 89
State Route 90
State Route 91 (part)
State Route 92 (part)
State Route 93
State Route 94 (part)
U.S. Route 95 (part)
State Route 96
U.S. Route 97
State Route 98
State Route 99
State Route 100
U.S. Route 101 (part)
State Route 102
State Route 103
State Route 104
Interstate 105
State Route 107
State Route 108
State Route 109
Interstate 110 and State Route 110 (part)
State Route 111 (part)
State Route 113 (part)
State Route 114
State Route 115
State Route 116 (part)
State Route 118
State Route 120 (part)
State Route 121
State Route 122
State Route 123
State Route 124
State Route 125
State Route 126
State Route 127 (part)
State Route 128 (part)
State Route 129
State Route 130
State Route 131
State Route 132 (part)
State Route 133 (part)
State Route 134
State Route 135 (part)
State Route 136
State Route 137 (part)
State Route 138 (part)
State Route 139
State Route 140
State Route 142 (part)
State Route 144
State Route 145
State Route 146
State Route 147
State Route 148
State Route 149
State Route 150
State Route 151
State Route 152 (part)
State Route 153
State Route 154
State Route 155
State Route 156
State Route 158
State Route 160 (part)
State Route 161
State Route 162
State Route 163
State Route 164
State Route 165
State Route 166 (part)
State Route 167
State Route 168 (part)
State Route 169
State Route 170 (part)
State Route 172
State Route 173
State Route 174
State Route 175
State Route 177
State Route 178 (part)
State Route 179
State Route 180 (part)
State Route 181
State Route 182
State Route 183
State Route 184
State Route 185
State Route 186
State Route 187
State Route 188
State Route 189
State Route 190 (part)
State Route 191
State Route 192
State Route 193 (part)
State Route 195
State Route 197
State Route 198 (part)
U.S. Route 199
State Route 200
State Route 201
State Route 202
State Route 203
State Route 204
Interstate 205
State Route 207
Interstate 210 and State Route 210
State Route 211
State Route 213
Interstate 215
State Route 216
State Route 217
State Route 218
State Route 219
State Route 220
State Route 221
State Route 222
State Route 223
State Route 225
State Route 227 (part)
State Route 229
State Route 230
State Route 232
State Route 233
State Route 236
State Route 237
Interstate 238 and State Route 238
State Route 241
State Route 242
State Route 243
State Route 244
State Route 245
State Route 246
State Route 247
State Route 253
State Route 254
State Route 255
State Route 259
State Route 261
State Route 262
State Route 263
State Route 265
State Route 266
State Route 267
State Route 269
State Route 270
State Route 271
State Route 273
State Route 275
Interstate 280
State Route 281 (part)
State Route 282
State Route 283
State Route 284
State Route 299 (part)
State Route 330
State Route 371
Interstate 380
U.S. Route 395 (part)
Interstate 405
Interstate 505
Interstate 580
Interstate 605
Interstate 680
Interstate 710 and State Route 710
Interstate 780
Interstate 805
Interstate 880
State Route 905 (part)
Interstate 980

See also

References

External links
California Highways

Lists of roads in California
 Freeway